The Queensland Academies – Science Mathematics & Technology Campus (QASMT) is a selective entry high school in Queensland, Australia, has developed in partnership with the University of Queensland. QASMT offers the International Baccalaureate Diploma Program to students in Years 11 and 12, and also offers the International Baccalaureate Middle Years Program to Year 7-10 students. The institution consistently performs above IB world-average, and is the highest performing school in Queensland based on ATAR and tertiary acceptance rates.

In 2021, Better Education ranked Queensland Academies for Science Mathematics & Technology Campus as the top performing school in the state of Queensland.

History
Premier Peter Beattie announced the creation of the Queensland Academies on 17 April 2005 as part of the Queensland Government's Smart State Strategy – a policy designed to foster knowledge, creativity, and innovation within QLD. The Queensland Academies – Science Mathematics & Technology Campus (QASMT) subsequently opened in January 2007. The school was established in partnership with the University of Queensland with a focus on sciences and mathematics. The site occupied by QASMT was formerly Toowong College; this location was chosen "to capitalise on its close educational and geographic links with the University of Queensland."

The site was occupied by the house known as Ormlie originally and later as Easton Gray and owned by Sir Arthur Hunter Palmer, Premier of Queensland and subsequently the residence of his brother-in-law Hugh Mosman (who discovered gold at Charters Towers). Easton Gray was sold in 1944 for the construction of Toowong State High School, later Toowong College.

The first cohort of students graduated from QASMT in 2008.

Two other academies were created with close ties to QASMT. In 2007, the Queensland Academy for Creative Industries (QACI) was established in partnership with the Queensland University of Technology with a focus towards media, film, design and technology, music, theatre arts, and visual arts. In 2008, the Queensland Academy for Health Sciences (QAHS) was developed in partnership with Griffith University with a focus towards medicine, dentistry, physiotherapy, optometry, and medical research.

In 2019, QASMT introduced its Middle School Program with its new Grade 7 cohort. In 2021, QASMT became a fully complete 7-12 school. To cater for the new students, QASMT was expanded in a 2-stage approach.

Stage 1 was completed in January 2019 to accommodate the first cohort of Year 7 students. Stage 1 included the refurbishment of existing buildings and the installation of prefabricated accommodation while stage 2 was being delivered.

Stage 2 delivered new educational infrastructure and facilities to cater for the Years 8 and 9 students at the school. Stage 2 works commenced in February 2019 and includes the delivery of a new Northern Learning Centre and a new Eastern Science Technology Engineering & Mathematics (STEM) hub.

The construction of the new Eastern Science Technology Engineering & Mathematics was completed in December 2019 and is currently in use. The remaining Stage 2 building works, including the Northern Learning Centre, were completed in mid-2020.

Principals:
 Stephen Loggie (2007–2009)
 Kath Kayrooz (2010–2013)
 Judy Neilson (2014)
 Kath Kayrooz (2015–present)

Academic results
In 2021:
 9 students received perfect IB score of 45
 19 students received an IB score of 44
 92 students achieved an IB score of 40+

See also
  International Baccalaureate Organisation
  Queensland Academy for Creative Industries
  Queensland Academy for Health Sciences

References

External links
  Queensland Academies Homepage
  QASMT Homepage

Public high schools in Brisbane
Educational institutions established in 2007
International Baccalaureate schools in Australia
Toowong
2007 establishments in Australia